In Philosophy, logical holism is the belief that the world operates in such a way that no part can be known without the whole being known first. 

Theoretical holism is a theory in philosophy of science, that a theory of science can only be understood in its entirety, introduced by Pierre Duhem. Different total theories of science are understood by making them commensurable allowing statements in one theory to be converted to sentences in another. Richard Rorty argued that when two theories are incompatible a process of hermeneutics is necessary.

Practical holism is a concept in the work of Martin Heidegger than posits it not possible to produce a complete understanding of one's own experience of reality because your mode of existence is embedded in cultural practices, the constraints of the task that you are doing. 

Bertrand Russell concluded that "Hegel's dialectical logical holism should be dismissed in favour of the new logic of propositional analysis." and introduced a form of logical atomism.

See also 
 Doctrine of internal relations
Meaning holism

References

Holism
Metaphysical theories
Epistemological theories
Theories of deduction